This is a list of professors from the University of São Paulo.

 Aziz Ab'Saber
 Vahan Agopyan
 Ana Fani Alessandri Carlos
 Paul Arbousse-Bastide
 Robert Henri Aubreton (he also received an honorary degree)
 Roger Bastide
 Fernand Braudel
 David Bohm
 Antonio Candido
 Fernando Henrique Cardoso, former President of Brazil
 Paulo C. Chagas
 François Châtelet
 João Cruz Costa
 Newton da Costa
 Sérgio Buarque de Holanda
 Jean Dieudonné
 Alessandro Donati
 Luigi Fantappiè
 Clóvis de Barros Filho
 Henrique Fleming
 Vilém Flusser
 Luciano da Fontoura Costa
 Johann Julius Gottfried Ludwig Frank or Julius Frank (1834–1841)
 Giorgio Eugenio Oscare Giacaglia
 Ernesto Giesbrecht
 Victor Goldschmidt
 Gilles Gaston Granger
 Ada Pellegrini Grinover
 Martial Guéroult
 Ernst Wolfgang Hamburger
 Heinrich Hauptman
 Felix Hegg
 Heinz Dieter Heidemann
 Iacov Hillel
 Paul Hugon
 István Jancsó
 Warwick Kerr
 Bernardo Kucinski
 César Lattes
 Gérard Lebrun
 Claude Lévi-Strauss
 José Eduardo Martins
 Armen Mamigonian
 Jean Maugüe
 Lambert Meyer
 Pierre Monbeig
 Herch Moysés Nussenzveig
 Giuseppe Occhialini
 Décio Pignatari		
 Jaime Pinsky
 Heinrich Rheinboldt
 Anatol Rosenfeld
 Emir Sader
 Milton Santos
 Egon Schaden
 Mário Schenberg
 Valdemar Setzer
 Larry Thompson, chemist
 Kokei Uehara
 Giuseppe Ungaretti	
 Jean-Pierre Vernant
 Claus Leon Warschauer
 Gleb Wataghin
 Emilio Willems

References

University
São Paulo